This is the family tree of the de Lacys of Pontefract  who were the holders of both Pontefract Castle and the Honour of Pontefract from 1067 to 1348.

 The holders of the castle and Honour of Pontefract are indicated by an asterisk.

Notes

Sources

Padgett, Lorenzo, Chronicles of Old Pontefract (1905) facsimile published 1993, Old Hall Press, Leeds

Family trees
Pontefract
De Lacy family